Darryl Kelly (d. 2019) was a Canadian politician. He represented the riding of Humber Valley in the Newfoundland and Labrador House of Assembly from 2007 to 2011 as a member of the Progressive Conservatives.

Kelly stood as the Progressive Conservative candidate in a by-election in Humber Valley on February 13, 2007, losing by a margin of just seven votes to Liberal candidate Dwight Ball. However, Kelly defeated Ball in the general election on October 9, 2007. In the 2011 general election Kelly was defeated in a rematch against Ball.

Electoral history

|-

|-

|-

|-

|-

|-

|-

References

External links
Darryl Kelly's PC Party biography

Progressive Conservative Party of Newfoundland and Labrador MHAs
Living people
21st-century Canadian politicians
People from Deer Lake, Newfoundland and Labrador
Year of birth missing (living people)